Raadik is an Estonian surname. Notable people the surname include:

 Andrus Raadik, Estonian volleyball player
 Anton Raadik, Estonian middleweight boxer
 Pille Raadik, Estonian soccer player 
 Rain Raadik, Estonian professional basketball player
 Toomas Raadik, Estonian professional basketball player

Estonian-language surnames